David Wexler may refer to:

 David B. Wexler, professor of law 
 David Wexler (director) (born 1983), American film director, screenwriter and film producer